The 2014 New South Wales Cup season is the second tier rugby league competition held in New South Wales, after the National Rugby League. The 2014 season will kick off on Saturday, 8 March 2014.

Clubs
In 2014, 13 clubs are fielding teams in the New South Wales Cup. The New Zealand Warriors have replaced the Auckland Vulcans and the Penrith Panthers have returned to the competition replacing the Windsor Wolves this season.

*: The season the team joined is in the NSW Cup, not any other competition before this.

Ladder

Season

Round 1

BYE: Newtown

Round 2

BYE: North Sydney

Round 3

BYE: NZ Warriors

Round 4

Round 5

Round 6

Round 7

BYE: Penrith

Round 8

BYE: West Tigers

Round 8b

BYE: Cronulla

Round 9

BYE:Wyong

Round 10

BYE: Mounties

Round 11

BYE: Wentworthville

Round 12

BYE: Cantebury

Round 13

BYE: Manly

Round 14

BYE: West Tigers

Round 15

BYE: Wentworthville

Round 16

BYE: North Sydney

Round 17

BYE:  NZ Warriors vs BYE

Round 18

BYE: Wyong

Round 19

BYE: Newcastle

Round 20

BYE: Mounties

Round 21

BYE: Cronulla

Round 22

BYE: Newtown

Round 23

BYE: Penrith

Round 24

BYE: Cantebury

Round 25

BYE: Illawarra

Final Series Chart

Qualifying/Elimination Finals

Semi-finals

Preliminary-Finals

Grand Final

2014 NRL State Championship match
NRL State Championship
From 2014 New South Wales Cup Premiers will play against the Queensland Cup Premiers with the winner to be crowned the Inaugural NRL State Champions.

See also

References

External links

New South Wales Cup
2014 in Australian rugby league
2014 in New Zealand rugby league